Each year Ireland selects a number of bands and musicians to participate in the Eurosonic Festival in Groningen, Netherlands. In recent years, RTÉ 2fm,  have sponsored two bands per festival.

Ireland's entries 

Undated: Other entries have included JJ72 and Bass Odyssey.

References

External links 
 Eurosonic page on 2fm
 Jim Carroll reports on Eurosonic 08 bands selection
 Jim Carroll on Eurosonic 07
 Humanzi at Eurosonic 07
 Irish Eurosonic acts 2006-2008

Eurosonic Festival
Eurosonic Noorderslag